Fisherian runaway or runaway selection is a sexual selection mechanism proposed by the mathematical biologist Ronald Fisher in the early 20th century, to account for the evolution of ostentatious male ornamentation by persistent, directional female choice. An example is the colourful and elaborate peacock plumage compared to the relatively subdued peahen plumage; the costly ornaments, notably the bird's extremely long tail, appear to be incompatible with natural selection. Fisherian runaway can be postulated to include sexually dimorphic phenotypic traits such as behavior expressed by a particular sex.

Extreme and (seemingly) maladaptive sexual dimorphism represented a paradox for evolutionary biologists from Charles Darwin's time  up to the modern synthesis. Darwin attempted to resolve the paradox by assuming heredity for both the preference and the ornament, and supposed an "aesthetic sense" in higher animals, leading to powerful selection of both characteristics in subsequent generations. Fisher developed the theory further by assuming genetic correlation between the preference and the ornament, that initially the ornament signalled greater potential fitness (the likelihood of leaving more descendants), so preference for the ornament had a selective advantage. Subsequently, if strong enough, female preference for exaggerated ornamentation in mate selection could be enough to undermine natural selection even when the ornament has become non-adaptive. Over subsequent generations this could lead to runaway selection by positive feedback, and the speed with which the trait and the preference increase could (until counter-selection interferes) increase exponentially.

Modern description of the same mechanism using quantitative genetic and population genetic models was mainly established by Russell Lande and Mark Kirkpatrick in the 1980s, and are now more commonly referred to as the sexy son hypothesis.

History

From Charles Darwin to Ronald Fisher 

Charles Darwin published a book on sexual selection in 1871 called The Descent of Man, and Selection in Relation to Sex, which garnered interest upon its release but by the 1880s the ideas had been deemed too controversial and were largely neglected. Alfred Russel Wallace disagreed with Darwin, particularly after Darwin's death, that sexual selection was a real phenomenon.

Ronald Fisher was one of the few other biologists to engage with the question. When Wallace stated that animals show no sexual preference in his 1915 paper, The evolution of sexual preference, Fisher publicly disagreed:

Fisher, in the foundational 1930 book, The Genetical Theory of Natural Selection, first outlined a model by which runaway inter-sexual selection could lead to sexually dimorphic male ornamentation based upon female choice and a preference for "attractive" but otherwise non-adaptive traits in male mates. He suggested that selection for traits that increase fitness may be quite common:

A strong female choice for the expression alone, as opposed to the function, of a male ornament can oppose and undermine the forces of natural selection and result in the runaway sexual selection that leads to the further exaggeration of the ornament (as well as the preference) until the costs (incurred by natural selection) of the expression become greater than the benefit (bestowed by sexual selection).

Peacocks and sexual dimorphism 

The plumage dimorphism of the peacock and peahen of the species within the genus Pavo is a prime example of the ornamentation paradox that has long puzzled evolutionary biologists; Darwin wrote in 1860:The sight of a feather in a peacock’s tail, whenever I gaze at it, makes me sick!The peacock's colourful and elaborate tail requires a great deal of energy to grow and maintain. It also reduces the bird's agility, and may increase the animal's visibility to predators. The tail appears to lower the overall fitness of the individuals who possess it. Yet, it has evolved, indicating that peacocks who have longer and more colourfully elaborate tails have some advantage over peacocks who do not. Fisherian runaway posits that the evolution of the peacock tail is made possible if peahens have a preference to mate with peacocks that possess a longer and more colourful tail. Peahens that select males with these tails in turn have male offspring that are more likely to have long and colourful tails and thus are more likely to be sexually successful themselves. Equally importantly, the female offspring of these peahens are more likely to have a preference for peacocks with longer and more colourful tails. However, though the relative fitness of males with large tails is higher than those without, the absolute fitness levels of all the members of the population (both male and female) is less than it would be if none of the peahens (or only a small number) had a preference for a longer or more colourful tail.

Mechanism

Initiation 

Fisher outlined two fundamental conditions that must be fulfilled for the Fisherian runaway mechanism to lead to the evolution of extreme ornamentation: 

 Sexual preference in at least one of the sexes
 A corresponding reproductive advantage to the preference.

Fisher argued in his 1915 paper, "The evolution of sexual preference" that the type of female preference necessary for Fisherian runaway could be initiated without any understanding or appreciation for beauty. Fisher suggested that any visible features that indicate fitness, that are not themselves adaptive, that draw attention, and that vary in their appearance amongst the population of males so that the females can easily compare them, would be enough to initiate Fisherian runaway. This suggestion is compatible with his theory, and indicates that the choice of feature is essentially arbitrary, and could be different in different populations. Such arbitrariness is borne out by mathematical modelling, and by observation of isolated populations of sandgrouse, where the males can differ markedly from those in other populations.

Genetic basis 

Fisherian runaway assumes that sexual preference in females and ornamentation in males are both genetically variable (heritable).

Female choice 
Fisher argued that the selection for exaggerated male ornamentation is driven by the coupled exaggeration of female sexual preference for the ornament.

Positive feedback 

Over time a positive feedback mechanism, one that involves a loop in which an increase in a quantity causes a further increase in the same quantity, will see more exaggerated sons and choosier daughters being produced with each successive generation; resulting in the runaway selection for the further exaggeration of both the ornament and the preference (until the costs for producing the ornament outweigh the reproductive benefit of possessing it).

Alternative hypotheses

Several alternative hypotheses use the same genetic runaway (or positive feedback) mechanism but differ in the mechanisms of the initiation. Indicator hypotheses suggest that females choose desirably ornamented males because the cost of producing the desirable ornaments is indicative of good genes by way of the individual's vigour; for instance, the handicap principle proposes that females distinguish the best males by the measurable cost of certain visible features which have no other purpose, by analogy with a handicap race, in which the best horses carry the largest weights.

The sensory exploitation hypothesis  proposes that sexual preferences for exaggerated traits are the result of sensory biases, such as that for supernormal stimuli.

See also

 Evolutionary suicide
 Secondary sex characteristic

References

Sexual selection

Philosophy of biology